Black Patch Park is a park in Smethwick, West Midlands, England.

These factories, including the Soho Foundry, started by James Watt and Matthew Boulton are, but for foundations and frontages, almost all gone.

Much of what is known about Black Patch Chaplin Park appears in a book by Ted Rudge, developed from an Open University degree thesis, and published by Birmingham City Council in 2003. Rudge's research records how, from the mid-19th century until they were evicted from it at the start of the 20th, the 'Black Patch' was the camping ground of a community of tent and vardo (caravan) dwellers who were to become integrated with 'gaujos' (non-Gypsies) in surrounding districts.  The Gypsies on the Black Patch lived on a deep barren layer of furnace waste, which, after their eviction, was cleared down to grass growing soil to create a park. There is disputed evidence that Charlie Chaplin might have been born at Black Patch.

Situation 
 
Black Patch Park lies 2½ miles from Birmingham city centre just outside the boundary of the city, and is surrounded north, east and south by railway embankments. One of these carries the Birmingham - Wolverhampton part of West Coast Main Line. That and the A41 and the Birmingham Canal Navigations' Birmingham to Wolverhampton 'Mainline' canals - old and new - are arteries of the region's 'North West Corridor of Regeneration'.

In the centre of Black Patch Park, Boundary Brook, which for centuries marked a boundary between Staffordshire and Warwickshire, meets Hockley Brook, which once separated the country villages of Handsworth and Smethwick. Boundary Brook enters from the South, while Hockley Brook comes in from the West under Woodburn Road.

The park is linked to the Birmingham main line canal via a route through Avery Road that connects it to the West Midlands Sustrans Cycle Route 5, running along the canal towpath, part of a National Cycle Network running from the Cotswolds via Stratford-upon-Avon, Warwick, Birmingham, and Stafford to Stoke-on-Trent in Staffordshire.

Black Patch Park is edged by Foundry Lane to the west and south, Woodburn Road to the north, and to the east, Perrott Street, beyond which, as far as Handsworth New Road, stretches the triangle of Merry Hill Allotment Gardens. The West Midlands Metro has two stops nearby; Winson Green Outer Circle and Handsworth Booth Street. Kitchener Street which, until they were demolished in 1980, ran between terraced houses, was gated in January 2009 under section 129A of the Highways act 1980 - a measure intended by Sandwell MBC to prevent extensive fly-tipping.

Industrial Revolution 

In 1769 James Brindley supervised the building of a canal between Birmingham and the Black Country. This waterway came to be known, within 60 years, as the 'old' Main Line Canal after Thomas Telford constructed a straighter, broader New Birmingham Main Line Canal, which opened in 1829 to carry an ever-increasing volume of narrow boat traffic. Brindley and Telford's waterways attracted industrial entrepreneurs including Matthew Boulton, and James Watt who bought  by the canal at Merry Hill, about a mile from the firm's Soho Manufactory in Handsworth and opened the Soho Foundry in 1796 'for the purpose of casting everything relating to our steam engines'.

As the local population grew, tension developed between them and the travellers. Rudge records that Gypsies and travellers camped on the "Black Patch" from the mid-19th century, not always with approval of local people. Only in the early 20th century, and after several attempts, were the Gypsies finally and forcibly evicted from the 'Black Patch' as rising population density and new land owning assumptions placed greater and greater restriction on their traditional sites.

From being a thriving industrial site, the area was transformed in little more than a lifetime, to a site of dereliction, with the decline of almost all the park's surrounding industrial giants during the economic upheaval of the 1960s. One successful survivor is Avery Weigh-Tronix on Foundry Lane, the world's largest manufacturers of machines for weighing, counting, measuring and testing, whose main entrance is the frontage of Boulton's and Watt's old Soho Foundry opposite the 'Soho Foundry Tavern'.

Gypsy connection 
Rudge  says that Esau Smith was the acknowledged king of the Black Patch. When he died in 1901 at the age of 92, his widow Henty was elected queen. Even while Esau was alive it was generally understood by local people that the Gypsies gained legal rights to the land as squatters. Though such rights are seldom written down, it is said that deeds to this effect were destroyed when the king and queen's caravan was ritually burned after her death on 7 January 1907. Queen Henty, who was buried with her husband in the churchyard of St. Mary's Church, Handsworth, is said to have placed a curse on anyone who builds over the Black Patch, the subject of a song by the well known folk artist Bryn Phillips in September 2003.

In 1906 Mrs E J E Pilkington and Tangye Ltd were referred to as legal owners of Black Patch, having put it up for sale after employing land agents to carry out a court imposed eviction of the Gypsies on 26 July 1905. They did not finally relinquish links with the land until a "peaceful eviction" was negotiated by Birmingham Corporation Parks Department on 15 February 1909. Subsequent stories contribute to reasonable doubt as to who ought to have inherited the Black Patch and who now holds legal title to the Gypsies' old camping ground. Rudge reports that in 1960 Jane Badger, who lived near Black Patch, got into conversation while walking by the Park with a gentleman with an American accent. He claimed he owned the deeds to the land. This story resembles a statement made by Ray Plant, a distant relative of the Black Patch Gypsies, that a family called Murdock once owned the land and gave permission to camp there. According to Ray Plant when the Murdocks emigrated to America they handed over the Black Patch deeds to the Gypsies. The deeds were apparently stolen making any of the gypsies  claims to the land unfounded. Many of the gypsy descendants still live in the surrounding area - the names of descendants accessible via the National Census.

In July 2005, a memorial plaque to the gypsies was erected. Sometime in March 2007 this plaque disappeared but has since been replaced.

Creating the Park 
Despite past and present doubts  about exact ownership the impetus for and organisation of its purchase and development as a public park came from the Birmingham Playgrounds, Open Spaces and Playing Fields Society, chaired by John Nettlefold, a Birmingham Councillor, married into the Chamberlain family. A mix of public subscription and cash from Smethwick and Handsworth Councils and Birmingham Corporation raised £12,200. One of the vendors, Mrs Pilkington, donated £500 from the conveyance to assist with their aim of providing a place where people could enjoy fresh air away from the smoky atmosphere of the surrounding factories. The new public space was divided into three;  in Handsworth, seven in Smethwick and seven in Birmingham. Further land was acquired to build Perrott Street, widen the Great Western Railway and provide the Merry Hill Allotments on the other side of Perrott Street. Birmingham Corporation was asked by the Society to lay out and manage Black Patch Park. Unemployed people under the supervision of a Parks' Superintendent carried out this work. It began in January 1909 and was completed in May 1910. The Lord Mayor of Birmingham, Alderman Bowater, formally opened the Black Patch Recreation Ground on 20 June 1911. In 1966 management was taken over by the new Borough of Warley, now Sandwell Metropolitan Council, whose Planning Department confirms that covenants held by Pilkington and Tangye still exist, but until then Black Patch Park was under the stewardship of Birmingham Parks Department.

Campaign to save Black Patch Park 

In August 2003 a campaigning group called "The Friends of Black Patch Park"  was formed to challenge proposals outlined in Sandwell Council's Unitary Development Plan to zone two thirds of the park for industrial use. The aim of the Friends of Black Patch Park has been to protect, celebrate and enhance the park's  - as originally created by public subscription in 1907 - as a place of historic importance and indispensable green space for future generations. As well as its legacy as a traditional Romany camping ground, the park's current value is as a wildlife oasis, a place for quiet walks and relaxation and an essential site for a large number of young people from diverse backgrounds to practice sport. Footballers from the Soho Foundry Tavern and many other Warley League Teams, are strongly against the loss of the playing fields that make up the largest part of the Black Patch.

Regeneration 
Agenda item 5 of a Report to the Cabinet Member for Regeneration and Transport, Councillor Bob Badham, Sandwell MBC, dated 21 February 2007, states:

 Within the adopted Unitary Development Plan, sites around Black Patch Park, near to the Soho Foundry were allocated for industrial uses in order to attract investment for a Technology Park. However, this has not come to fruition. A recent Employment Land Survey has revealed that there is no immediate need for further industrial land in this location. As there are no deliverable proposals identified, and to accommodate the wishes of Friends of Black Patch Park to retain the Park area, these allocations have been removed. The land will therefore form a green focal point for any development which takes place on the adjoining sites. The Preferred Option for land adjacent to Soho Foundry has been allocated for Mixed Used which can incorporate industrial and offices, and possibly leisure, community and educational facilities associated to the Foundry once a suitable re-use has been identified. Smethwick Area Action Plan - Preferred Option Document (Cabinet Forward Plan Ref. No. RT089). 

On 30 August 2017 Sandwell MBC Cabinet, under the leadership of Cllr Steve Eling, agreed a policy to rezone land around Black Patch Park for housing. On 16 January 2018 Full Council received and approved the minutes of Cabinet to the effect that:
 (1) that the proposals for a land use change to the sites in the Black Patch area, Smethwick to that of residential be noted;
(2) that a masterplan and Interim Planning Statement be prepared as the way forward for the Black Patch, Smethwick area;

(3) that in connection with Resolution (2) above, a further report be submitted to the Cabinet on the draft masterplan and Interim Planning Statement prior to public consultation being undertaken;
(4) that consultation be undertaken with Merry Hill Allotment plot holders to consider relocation to an alternative allotment site and the results of the consultation be submitted to Cabinet in due course.

References 

David Papadopoulos (2002) Spatialities of Dereliction
Ted Rudge (2003) Brumroamin: Birmingham and Midland Romany Gypsy and Traveller Culture. Birmingham City Council Department of Leisure & Community Services (2003)

External links 
BBC on 'Brumroamin'
Built Environment Cabinet member Cllr Bob Badham talks about Sandwell MBC's policies to save Black Patch Park 
Images to supplement this article
 Revolutionary Players. History of the Industrial Revolution in the West Midlands.
Smethwick Local History Society 
Soho Foundry Soho Foundry
Ted Rudge's 'Romany Memorial'[6]
Ted Rudge's website on the campaign to save Black Patch Park (including the text of Bryn Phillips song)()
 The Smethwick Town Plan (PDF document). See section on the 'Foundry Lane Action Area' in paras 8.6.1 to 8.6.20, pp. 116–120 (map on page 120) and in Appendix 1, p. 128. As indicated at the conclusion of this article The Smethwick Town Plan is now under review, though any changes supported by Sandwell MBC must be approved by the Secretary of State under the terms of the Planning and Compulsory Purchase Act 2004 

Parks and open spaces in the West Midlands (county)
Smethwick
Romani communities in the United Kingdom
Industrial archaeology